Adriano Neves Pereira (born 24 May 1979 in Capão da Canoa, Rio Grande do Sul, Brazil), commonly known as Adriano Chuva, is a Brazilian footballer who currently plays for Atlético Sorocaba, primarily as a striker.

A tall, powerful forward, he is known for his pace, tactical awareness, speed, dribbling and accurate shooting.

Chuva is perhaps best described as a journeyman, namely because he has turned out for over twelve different clubs since he started his professional career with Juventude in 1997. However, despite his inability to settle, he has nevertheless proved himself to be a prolific goal-scorer wherever he has happened to play.

Born Adriano Neves Pereira he was given his nickname, Chuva, at a young age by his mother Simone in deference to a family friend of the same name whom she thought Adriano resembled.

Honours
 Campeonato Gaúcho in 1998 with Esporte Clube Juventude
 Campeonato Pernambucano in 2003 with Sport Club do Recife
 Campeonato Cearense in 2007 with Fortaleza Esporte Clube

External links

 
 

1979 births
Living people
Association football forwards
Brazilian footballers
Brazilian expatriate footballers
Esporte Clube Juventude players
Clube Atlético Mineiro players
Cruzeiro Esporte Clube players
Paraná Clube players
Grêmio Foot-Ball Porto Alegrense players
Sport Club do Recife players
Sociedade Esportiva Palmeiras players
Clube Náutico Capibaribe players
Fortaleza Esporte Clube players
Avaí FC players
Al Nassr FC players
Daejeon Hana Citizen FC players
Jeonnam Dragons players
Pohang Steelers players
Gwangju FC players
Campeonato Brasileiro Série A players
K League 1 players
Expatriate footballers in Saudi Arabia
Expatriate footballers in South Korea
Sportspeople from Rio Grande do Sul
Brazilian expatriate sportspeople in Saudi Arabia
Brazilian expatriate sportspeople in South Korea
Saudi Professional League players